The Dalriada Festival is a cultural and heritage festival of sport, music and foods that takes place in the village of Glenarm, Northern Ireland, United Kingdom annually in July. The main events take place at Glenarm Castle and include Highland Games, celebrity chef demonstrations, performing arts, live music, craft stalls and children's entertainment.

As part of the festival, Glenarm Castle also hosts outdoor concerts known as "DalriadaLIVE". Artists who have appeared at DalriadaLIVE include General Fiasco, Duke Special, Amici, The Priests, Brian Houston, David Phelps, Ronan Keating, Sharon Corr, Nathan Carter and Lisa McHugh. Glenarm village and the local area provides the location for the sporting events such as a triathlon, kids duathlon, mountain run, football, shinty, rowing regatta and horse hunt chase. The village also hosts community based events including a treasure hunt, fun run, it's a knockout, and foraging walk. In 2013, additional events were added to the festival programme including a hiring fair and a super EnduroCross competition at the old quarry in Glenarm. 2014 saw the festival's biggest crowd yet with over 25,000 in attendance. The festival week traditionally comes to end with a street carnival, live music and a fireworks finale.

References

External links
 Official Dalriada Festival Website
 Official Glenarm Castle Website
Festivals in Northern Ireland
Summer events in Northern Ireland